This is a list of women artists who were born in Turkey or whose artworks are closely associated with that country.

A
 Hale Asaf (1905–1938), painter
 Tomur Atagok (born 1939), painter and professor
 Ruzen Atakan (born 1966), Turkish-Cypriot painter

B
 Nezihe Bilgütay (Derler) (born 1926), miniaturist, Çini professional

C
 Sevgi Çağal (born 1957), painter and sculptor
 Nevin Çokay (1930–2012), painter

D
 Şükriye Dikmen (1918–2000), painter
 Ipek Duben (born 1941), contemporary visual artist

E
 Nese Erdok (born 1940), painter

G
 Leyla Gediz (born 1974), contemporary artist, based in Lisbon
 Hatice Güleryüz (born 1968), contemporary artist
 Nilbar Gures (born 1977), contemporary artist, based in Vienna

I
 Hülya Vurnal İkizgül (born 1966), mosaicist, sculptor, ceramist

K
 Müfide Kadri (1890–1912), painter 
 Nur Koçak (born 1941), contemporary artist
 Füreya Koral (1910–1997), ceramist

M
 Melek Mazici (born 1956), painter based in Helsinki
 Şükran Moral (born 1962), contemporary artist, poet, critic based in Rome and Istanbul

O
 Ayşe Ören (born 1980), architect, designer, sculptor
 Setenay Özbek (born 1961), artist

P
 Hayal Pozanti (born 1983), artist

S
 Gizem Saka (born 1978), painter
 Canan Şenol (born 1970), multidisciplinary visual artist
 Sevil Soyer (born 1950), contemporary painter and installation artist

T
 Hale Tenger (born 1960), contemporary artist
 Canan Tolon (born 1955), artist

V
 Emel Vardar, contemporary sculptor and painter

Y
 Nil Yalter (born 1938), contemporary artist

-
Turkish
Artists
Artists, women